The Vandorf Sideroad CNR Bridge is a railway bridge in the community of Vandorf, in the town of Whitchurch-Stouffville, Ontario, Canada.  The bridge carries the line known as the Canadian National Railway Bala Subdivision and crosses Woodbine Avenue diagonally at Vandorf Sideroad.

The concrete bridge abutments were built in 1950, and the builder's plate on the bridge confirms the steel deck was constructed in 1952 by the Central Bridge Company in Trenton, Ontario. It is mapped at approximately 302 metres above sea level.

References 

Railway bridges in Ontario
Canadian National Railway bridges in Ontario
Bridges completed in 1952